Professor Philip James Stradling Williams (11 January 1939 – 10 June 2003) was a Welsh politician for Plaid Cymru and scientist.

Background
Williams was born in Tredegar in the industrial valleys of south Wales and grew up in Bargoed, another industrial town. He was educated at Lewis School, Pengam and Clare College, Cambridge, and became a leading space scientist. He was appointed Professor of Solar Terrestrial Physics at the University College of Wales, Aberystwyth, and simultaneously became economic spokesman for Plaid Cymru.

Political career
He contested the 1968 Caerphilly by-election, where he came close to unseating Labour in a safe seat, and became the second Chairman of Plaid Cymru in 1970, a post he held until 1976; when he became vice president of the party. He was responsible for policy and research in the party for many years.

From 1999 to 2003, he was a Member of the National Assembly for Wales for the electoral region of South Wales East. Williams also stood for election in Blaenau Gwent in 1999 and got 21% of the vote.

Return to science and death
He stood down as an Assembly Member in 2003 to work on a research project to study the inner workings of the sun from the observatory near the North Pole. In 2001, he was voted Welsh Politician of the Year, and he was being pressured by former colleagues to become the next president of his party, following the resignation of Ieuan Wyn Jones as president. Shortly after standing down from the Welsh Assembly he suffered a heart attack while visiting a massage parlour in Cardiff and was pronounced dead shortly afterwards.

References

External links
 Rishbeth, Henry. "Obituary: P J S Williams 1939–2003", Astronomy & Geophysics, 44(5), 2003.
Plaid Cymru – the Party of Wales Website

Offices held

1939 births
2003 deaths
People from Tredegar
Academics of Aberystwyth University
Plaid Cymru members of the Senedd
Wales AMs 1999–2003
Plaid Cymru politicians
Welsh space scientists
People educated at Lewis School, Pengam
Alumni of Clare College, Cambridge
Welsh-speaking politicians
20th-century Welsh scientists